Segamat is a federal constituency in Segamat District, Johor, Malaysia, that has been represented in the Dewan Rakyat since 1955 to 1959 and 1974 to present.

The federal constituency was created in the 1955 redistribution and is mandated to return a single member to the Dewan Rakyat under the first past the post voting system.

Demographics

History

Polling districts 
According to the gazette issued on 31 October 2022, the Segamat constituency has a total of 43 polling districts.

Representation history

Note: 1Noted that in 1984 redelineation exercise this Segamat constituency is now shifted north to Segamat city centre from former Labis constituency, not Labis, Johor in Segamat District where now renamed as Labis.

State constituency

Current state assembly members

Local governments

Election results

References

Johor federal constituencies
Constituencies established in 1955
Constituencies disestablished in 1959